The International Federation of Audit Bureaux of Circulations (IFABC) is an organisation founded in 1963 in Stockholm, Sweden.

IFABC is a voluntary cooperative federation of industry-sponsored organizations established in nations throughout the world to verify and report facts about the circulations of publications and related data. (IFABC website)

A General Assembly of members is held every second year since 1963. Assemblies have been held in New York City, Paris, Munich, Copenhagen, London, Chicago, Madrid, Rio de Janeiro, Stockholm, Tokyo, Toronto, Buenos Aires, Lucerne, New Delhi, Berlin, Washington, D.C., Seville, Sydney, and Kuala Lumpur.

The aim of the IFABC is to work with national and international organisations that constructively support the goals and work of its members. The Federation facilitates the exchange of experience and best practice between member organisations.

Members organisations are committed to working towards a common goal of supporting transparency and accountability in the media data used for the purpose of evaluation of media channels by advertisers and media agencies.

History 
The first organised effort to verify circulation claims came in the United States. In 1914, advertisers, advertising agencies and publishers joined in a voluntary cooperative program, based on a common interest in reliable circulation data, to form the Audit Bureau of Circulations.

In the 1920s and 1930s, several other countries established similar organisations.

As advertising and publishing became more important in international marketing, bureaux to verify circulation were organised in various countries.

IFABC was founded in 1963. During the 13th International Advertising Association Congress held in Stockholm that year, audit bureaux leaders established a Working Committee to develop a set of By-laws. These were adopted informally by delegates of ten organisations on May 29, 1963.

Now there are audit bureaux in countries across the world, with the most established offering independent certification for more than 75 years. During the second half of the last century, many new audit bureaux were founded in countries where media trading was growing in sophistication and there was a clear need for greater accountability. Today, with media markets evolving faster than ever, this demand continues.

Self regulation is the guiding principle for every IFABC member. This is based on the conviction that whenever an industry is able to regulate itself with active involvement of al stakeholders, control by government is unnecessary. The IFABC system of published standards, voluntary acceptance of standards by media, impartial circulation audits, and the resulting reliable data, continues to be a constructive, and vital, force in international and national marketing.

Every second year, a General Assembly of members is held. Assemblies have been held in New York, Paris, Munich, Copenhagen, London, Chicago, Madrid, Rio de Janeiro, Stockholm, Tokyo, Toronto, Buenos Aires, Lucerne, New Delhi, Berlin, Washington, D.C., Seville, Sydney, Kuala Lumpur, Bern, London, Cancun and Seoul.

An Important step for the IFABC was the formation of the Global Web Standards Group in 1997, making the IFABC an early pioneer of looking at developing digital standards across boundaries.

Membership
They are four types of members.

Full members are members with full voting rights and use of the logo and slogan and comply with the basic rules and procedures as required by the IFABC Constitution and Bylaws. 
Affiliate Members are members that do not fully comply with the IFABC Constitution and Bylaws but are sufficiently compliant to be welcomed into the body with full participation.
Associate Membership is for companies who are closely aligned to the industries IFABC serves, for example paper supplies. 
Reciprocity Membership is for other media industry bodies who have similar interests to IFABC and are closely allied with us in terms of associated initiatives .

Only full members have full voting rights and use of the IFABC logo and slogan.

Vision and Mission 
The International Federation of Audit Bureaux of Certification (IFABC) is a voluntary cooperative federation of industry-sponsored organizations established in nations throughout the world to verify and report facts about the circulations of publications and related data.

According to the IFABC web page, their objectives are:

 To encourage and facilitate the exchange of experience between the member organizations.
 To work towards greater standardisation and uniformity in the reporting of circulations and other data.
 To encourage the establishment of an audit bureau of circulations in countries where such a bureau does not exist.
 To cooperate with national and international organizations in any way connected with members' activities.

Print metrics 
A print circulation audit system is a combination of rules, regulations, and protocols - backed by a team of people, operations and infrastructure, and independent verification. Its aim is to be capable of delivering to the marketplace a true picture of the circulation performance of the audited publications.

Only publishers possess the real and full picture of their title's circulation performance. By creating an ABC and its audit system, the advertising industry creates a mirror that most accurately reflects this performance. The picture must be clear, credible, understandable and unbiased. The data reported must be 100 percent reliable, comparable to similar other media indicators, and delivered in a timely manner.

The technical essence of the circulation audit is to independently verify the documentation and accounting of the publishers (in general by chartered public accountants), which act as proof of the different circulation types and quantities of a given publication, in a given time period.

The subject of the audits are the publishers, while the advertisers and media agencies, as well as the public, at large, are the consumers of the audited data. The role of the publishers is to take part in the audits, while the role of the other two other arms of the market is to formulate their needs relative to the data, which will be audited and published, and to manage the audit standards and processes. The three parties should work together on establishing the most practical, valid and reliable audit system for a given market.

See also
 Audit Bureau of Circulations
 Audit Bureau of Circulations (North America)
 Audit Bureau of Circulations (UK)
 Audit Bureau of Circulations (India)
 Norwegian Audit Bureau of Circulations
 OJD France
 OJD Morocco

References

External links
Official IFABC website

Newspapers circulation audit
Publishing organizations